Bomba, the Jungle Boy is a 1949 American adventure film directed by Ford Beebe. It was the first in a 12-film series featuring Bomba, a sort of teenage Tarzan, played by Johnny Sheffield, who as a child had played "Boy" in several previous Tarzan films.

Plot
A photographer and his daughter arrive in Africa hoping to capture the local wildlife on film. Instead, they encounter (and never end up photographing) a killer leopard, a swarm of locusts, deadly lion worshippers, and Bomba the Jungle Boy.

Bomba was raised by an aged naturalist, Cody Casson (since deceased). He now lives beyond the Great Rift. The photographer's daughter, wearing a well-tailored leopard skin, spends most of the film with Bomba, while her father, Commissioner Barnes, and Eli search for her.

Cast
 Johnny Sheffield as Bomba 
 Peggy Ann Garner as Patricia Harlan
 Onslow Stevens as George Harland
 Charles Irwin as Andy Barnes
 Smoki Whitfield as Eli
 Martin Wilkins as Mufti

Production
Walter Mirisch had been general manager of Monogram Pictures since 1945. They specialised in low-budget movies, including series of regular characters such as Charlie Chan, Joe Palooka and the Bowery Boys. Mirisch looked at the success of the Tarzan films and remembered the Bomba novels; he thought they might offer material to do a similar type of movie.

In November 1947 Monogram announced they had bought the rights to twenty of the stories. They assigned Walter Mirisch to oversee their production and said they intended to make three Bomba films per year. They were going to be in colour. They were seeking a male actor aged 18 to 20 to star.

In September 1948 Monogram's president Steve Broidy announced that the studio would make two Bomba films over the following year. (Other series at the studio included Joe Palooka, Charlie Chan and Bowery Boys.)

Mirisch later claimed he was paid $2,500 a film, and the success of the series launched him as a producer.

Reception
The New York Times called it a "dull flavorless picture about a vest pocket Tarzan." However the movie was a large success relative to its budget.

References

External links

Bomba the Jungle Boy at TCMDB

1949 films
American adventure films
Films directed by Ford Beebe
Films produced by Walter Mirisch
Monogram Pictures films
1949 adventure films
American black-and-white films
1940s American films